Herman Leroy Carter Jr. is an American former Negro league shortstop who played in the 1940s.

Carter played for the Philadelphia Stars in 1940. In four recorded games, he posted one hit in ten plate appearances.

References

External links
 and Seamheads

Year of birth missing
Place of birth missing
Philadelphia Stars players
Baseball shortstops